Heat content may refer to: